Stefano Argilli (born 5 January 1973) is an Italian former footballer who played as a midfielder and as a central defender.

Football career 
Argilli started his career at hometown club Rimini. In 1996, he left for Siena, where he played for the team from Serie C1 to Serie A. In summer 2005, he left for Modena of Serie B to seek more first team chance., signed a two-year contract

In January 2006, he joined Livorno of Serie A. In January 2007, he was transferred to Frosinone (Serie B). In August 2007, to Cremonese of Serie C1.

Honours
Siena
Serie C1: 1999–2000
Serie B: 2002–03

References

External links
 Profile at La Gazzetta dello Sport (2006–07) 
 Profile at Football.it 

Italian footballers
Rimini F.C. 1912 players
A.C.N. Siena 1904 players
Modena F.C. players
U.S. Livorno 1915 players
Frosinone Calcio players
U.S. Cremonese players
Serie A players
Serie B players
Association football central defenders
Sportspeople from Rimini
1973 births
Living people
Footballers from Emilia-Romagna